Camp Dennison is a census-designated place (CDP) just outside Indian Hill in southern Symmes Township, Hamilton County, Ohio, United States.  It has a post office with the ZIP code 45111. The population was 384 at the 2010 census.

History
The community was settled in 1796 by German immigrants. During the American Civil War, Camp Dennison served as a military recruiting and training post for the United States Army (see Camp Dennison). It is named for William Dennison, the 24th Governor of Ohio and U.S. Postmaster General under President Abraham Lincoln.

Geography
Ohio State Route 126, Glendale Milford Road, runs north-south through the center of the community.

Education
Residents of Camp Dennison have access to Indian Hill Exempted Village School District.

References

Census-designated places in Hamilton County, Ohio
Census-designated places in Ohio
1796 establishments in the Northwest Territory